Ishan Rangana (born 6 June 1993) is a Sri Lankan cricketer. He made his first-class debut for Sri Lanka Ports Authority Cricket Club in the 2012–13 Premier Trophy on 22 March 2013.

References

External links
 

1993 births
Living people
Sri Lankan cricketers
Bloomfield Cricket and Athletic Club cricketers
Nondescripts Cricket Club cricketers
Sri Lanka Ports Authority Cricket Club cricketers
Place of birth missing (living people)